Leaning to One Side was a diplomatic relations policy of the People’s Republic of China in its early years. The policy was more than just founding an alliance with the Soviet Union, but meant resolutely supporting the Communist bloc and opposing the imperialist and capitalist camp led by the United States of America.

Bibliography

External links 
Formulation of Foreign Policy of New China on the Eve of its Birth

References 

Foreign policy doctrines